Between the first century BC and the fourth century AD, several expeditions and explorations to Lake Chad and western Africa were conducted by groups of military and commercial units of Romans who moved across the Sahara and into the interior of Africa and its coast. The primary motivation for the expeditions was to secure sources of gold and spices.

Characteristics

The Romans organized expeditions to cross the Sahara along five different routes:

through the Western Sahara, toward the Niger River, near modern Timbuktu
through the Tibesti Mountains, toward Lake Chad and modern Nigeria
up the Nile valley through Egypt, toward the Great Rift Valley
along the western coast of Africa, toward the Sénégal River
along the coast of the Red Sea, toward the Horn of Africa, and perhaps modern Zanzibar.

All these expeditions were supported by legionaries and had mainly a commercial purpose. Only the one conducted by emperor Nero seemed to be a preparative for the conquest of Ethiopia or Nubia; in 62 AD, two legionaries explored the sources of the Nile.

One of the main objectives of the explorations was to locate and obtain gold, using camels to transport it overland back to Roman provinces on the Mediterranean coast.

The explorations near the coasts were supported by Roman ships and deeply related to overseas commerce.

Main explorations

The Romans conducted five main explorations: two in the western Sahara, two in the central Sahara, and one in the area of Lake Chad.

Western Sahara expeditions

In western Sahara there were two Roman expeditions but, just south of the Atlas mountains:

 Cornelius Balbus expedition: According to Pliny, the first Roman expedition through the Sahara was the one led by Cornelius Balbus, who in 19 BC probably reached the Niger River near Timbuktu. He embarked from Libyan Sabratha and with ten thousand legionaries conquered the Garamantes capital in Fezzan. He then sent a small group of his legionaries further south across the Ahaggar Mountains to explore the "land of the lions”. There they found the Niger River, which in their opinion flowed into the Nile River. In 1955, Roman coins and ceramics were found in the area of Mali.
 Suetonius Paulinus expedition: The second was done in the year 41 AD by Suetonius Paulinus, a Roman Consul, who was the first of the Romans who led an army across the Atlas range. At the end of ten days' march he reached the mountains summit covered by snow and later he arrived at a river called Gerj. He then penetrated into the semi deserted country south of Morocco and some of his legionaries probably went near the river Daras (modern Senegal river).

From the first century AD there is evidence (coins and fibulae) of Roman commerce and contacts in Akjoujt and Tamkartkart near Tichit in Mauritania.

Central Sahara expeditions

The two main explorations/expeditions in the central Sahara were:

Flaccus expedition: In the First Century AD, Lake Chad was a huge lake and two Roman expeditions were carried out in order to reach it: Septimius Flaccus and Julius Maternus reached the "lake of hippopotamus" (as Lake Chad was called by Ptolemy). They moved from coastal Tripolitania and passed near the Tibesti mountains. Both did their expeditions through the Garamantes' territories, and were able to leave a small garrison on the "lake of hippopotamus and rhinoceros" after 3 months of travel in desert lands.Ptolemy wrote that in 50 AD Septimius Flaccus carried out his expedition in order to retaliate against nomad raiders who attacked Leptis Magna, and reached Sebha and the territory of Aozou. He then reached the Bahr Erguig, Chari, and Logone Rivers in the lake Chad area, described as the "land of Ethiopes" (or black men) and called Agisymba.
Matiernus expedition: Ptolemy wrote that around 90 AD Julius Maternus (or Matiernus) carried out a mainly commercial expedition. From the Sirte gulf he reached the Oasis of Cufra and the Oasis of Archei, then arrived—after 4 months travelling with the king of the Garamantes—to the Bahr Salamat and Bahr Aouk Rivers, near modern-day Central African Republic in a region then called Agisymba. He went back to Rome with a rhinoceros with two horns, that was shown in the Colosseum.According to Raffael Joorde, Maternus was a diplomat who explored with the king of Garamantes the territory south of the Tibesti mountains, while this king executed a military campaign against rebellious subjects or as a "razzia".

Niger River area

However some historians (like Susan Raven) believe that there was even another Roman expedition to sub-saharan central Africa: the one of Valerius Festus, that could have reached the equatorial Africa thanks to the Niger River.
Festus expedition: Pliny wrote that in 70 AD a legatus legionis, or commander, of the Legio III Augusta named Festus repeated the Balbus expedition toward the Niger River. Festus went to the eastern Hoggar Mountains and penetrated the Air Mountains as far as the Gadoufaoua plain. Gadoufaoua (Touareg for “the place where camels fear to go”) is a site in the Tenere desert of Niger known for its extensive fossil graveyard, where remains of Sarcosuchus imperator, popularly known as SuperCroc, have been found). Festus finally arrived in the area in which Timbuktu is now located. Some academics, such as Fage, think that he only reached the Ghat region in southern Libya, near the border with southern Algeria and Niger.  However, it is possible that a few of his legionaries reached as far as the Niger River and went down to the equatorial forests navigating the river to the estuary in what is now Nigeria. Something similar may have occurred in the exploration of the Nile done under Emperor Nero.

Maritime explorations

The Roman vassal king Juba II organized successful trade from the area of Volubilis. Pliny the Elder, who was not only an author but also a military officer, drawing upon the accounts of Juba II, king of Mauretania in the first century AD, stated that a Roman expedition from Mauritania visited the islands of the archipelago of the Canaries and Madeira around 10 AD and found great ruins but no population, only dogs (the basis of the name the Canaries).
	
According to Pliny the Elder, an expedition of Mauretanians sent by Juba II to the archipelago visited the islands: when King Juba II dispatched a contingent to re-open the dye production facility at Mogador (historical name of Essaouira, Morocco) in the early 1st century AD, Juba's naval force was subsequently sent to explore the Canary Islands, and possibly Madeira, using Mogador as their base.

Other Roman coins have been found in Nigeria and Niger, and also in Guinea, Togo, and Ghana. However, it is much more likely that all these coins were introduced at a much later date than that there was direct Roman intercourse so far down the western coast. No single article unmistakably originating in Africa south of the Equator has been discovered in the Graeco-Roman world or in contemporary Arabia, nor is there any mention of such an article in written records: while the coins are the only ancient European or Arabian articles that have been found in the central parts of Africa.
	
The Romans had two naval outposts in the Atlantic coast of Africa: Sala Colonia near present Rabat and Mogador in southern Morocco (north of Agadir). The island of Mogador prospered from the local purple dye-making industry (highly esteemed in imperial Rome) from the reigns of Augustus until Septimius Severus. Augustus, based on the discovery of a sunken merchant ship from southern Hispania in the Djibouti area (found by his adoptive son Gaius Caesar when he sailed toward Aden), wanted to organize an expedition from Egypt to Mogador and Sala around Africa, but it seems that it never took place.

See also
 Roman Empire
 European exploration of Africa
 Nero's exploration of the Nile

Notes

Bibliography

Coleman De Graft-Johnson, John. African glory: the story of vanished Negro civilizations. Black Classic Press. New York, 1986 
Fage, JD. The Cambridge History of Africa Volume 2. Cambridge University Press. Cambridge, 1979 
Mattern, Susan. Rome and the enemy: imperial strategy in the principate. University of California Press. San Francisco, 2002 
Miller, J. Innes. The Cinnamon Route in the Spice Trade of the Roman Empire. University Press. Oxford, 1996 
Raven, Susan. Rome in Africa. Publisher Routledge. London, 2012  
Roth, Jonathan. The logistics of the Roman Army at war (264 B.C. – A.D. 235). Köln : Brill, 1998 (Columbia studies in the classical tradition ; Vol. 23) 
The Cambridge History of Africa, Volume 2 (from CA. 500 B.C. to A.D. 1050). Michael Crowder (& J. Fage). Cambridge University Press, 1975 ISBN 

Roman Empire
Exploration of Africa